Anna Erika Pakkala (born ) is a Finnish female artistic gymnast, representing her nation at international competitions. 

She competed at world championships, including the 2014 World Artistic Gymnastics Championships in  Nanning, China.

References

External links
https://database.fig-gymnastics.com/public/gymnasts/biography/9906/true?backUrl=%2Fpublic%2Fresults%2Fdisplay%2F5529%3FidAgeCategory%3D4%26idCategory%3D69%23anchor_14417
http://www.les-sports.info/anna-erika-pakkala-gymnastique-spf362112.html
https://thegymter.net/2014/09/10/worlds-nominative-list-released/
http://chimgym.blogspot.com.br/2012/03/cottbus-world-cup-qualifications.html
http://www.intlgymnast.com/index.php?option=com_content&view=article&id=3475:dementyeva-vernyayev-best-in-barcelona&catid=5:competition-reports&Itemid=221
https://web.archive.org/web/20160330161008/http://www.2cfoto.no/world_championship_artistic_gymnastics_2014_men_qualification_day_4/h35835582#h35835582

1995 births
Living people
Finnish female artistic gymnasts
Place of birth missing (living people)
Gymnasts at the 2010 Summer Youth Olympics
21st-century Finnish women